Avery is an unincorporated community in Benton and Hickory counties, Missouri, United States.

A post office called Avery was established in 1890, and remained in operation until 1897. The community has the name of Henry Avery, a county commissioner.

References

Unincorporated communities in Benton County, Missouri
Unincorporated communities in Hickory County, Missouri
Unincorporated communities in Missouri